Dysomma is a genus of eels in the cutthroat eel family Synaphobranchidae.

Species
There are currently 16 recognized species in this genus:
 Dysomma anguillare Barnard, 1923 (Short-belly arrowtooth eel)
 Dysomma brachygnathos H. C. Ho & Tighe, 2018 (Short-jaw cutthroat eel)
 Dysomma brevirostre (Facciolà, 1887) (Pig-nosed arrowtooth eel)
 Dysomma bucephalus Alcock, 1889
 Dysomma dolichosomatum Karrer, 1982
 Dysomma formosa H. C. Ho & Tighe, 2018 (White cutthroat eel)
 Dysomma fuscoventralis Karrer & Klausewitz, 1982
 Dysomma goslinei C. H. Robins & C. R. Robins, 1976
 Dysomma longirostrum Y. Y. Chen & H. K. Mok, 2001
 Dysomma melanurum J. S. T. F. Chen & H. T. C. Weng, 1967
 Dysomma muciparus (Alcock, 1891)
 Dysomma opisthoproctus Y. Y. Chen & H. K. Mok, 1995
 Dysomma polycatodon Karrer, 1982
 Dysomma robinsorum H. C. Ho & Tighe, 2018 (Robinses' cutthroat eel)
 Dysomma taiwanensis H. C. Ho, D. G. Smith & Tighe, 2015 (Taiwanese arrowtooth eel) 
 Dysomma tridens C. H. Robins, E. B. Böhlke & C. R. Robins, 1989

References

Synaphobranchidae
Taxa named by Alfred William Alcock